Fred Hume may refer to:

 Frederick Hume (1892–1967), mayor of Vancouver, British Columbia
 Fred Hume (rugby league) (1898–1978), Australian rugby league player
 Fred Hume (American football), American college football quarterback in 1901